Pushpanjali is a 1972 Indian Malayalam drama film, directed by J. Sasikumar and produced by P. V. Sathyam. The film stars Prem Nazir (in triple roles) and Vijayasree in the lead roles. The film had musical score by M. K. Arjunan. The film was a remake of the Bengali film Uttar Falguni based on the story of Dr. Nihar Ranjan Gupta.

Cast
Prem Nazir as Thampi/Ravi/Chandran
Vijayasree as Usha
Kaviyoor Ponnamma as Thampi's Wife
Adoor Bhasi as Pachupilla
Jose Prakash as Damu
Prema as Renuka
T. S. Muthaiah as Madhava Menon
Sadhana as Salome

Soundtrack

References

External links
 

1972 films
1970s Malayalam-language films
Malayalam remakes of Bengali films
Films based on works by Nihar Ranjan Gupta
Indian drama films
Films directed by J. Sasikumar